DNA topoisomerase 3-beta-1 is an enzyme that in humans is encoded by the TOP3B gene.

This gene encodes a DNA topoisomerase, an enzyme that controls and alters the topologic states of DNA during transcription. This enzyme catalyzes the transient breaking and rejoining of a single strand of DNA which allows the strands to pass through one another, thus relaxing the supercoils and altering the topology of DNA. The enzyme interacts with DNA helicase SGS1 and plays a role in DNA recombination, cellular aging and maintenance of genome stability. Alternative splicing of the C-terminus of this gene results in three transcript variants which have distinct tissue specificity; however, not all variants have been fully described.

References

Further reading